CBE is an Ethiopian professional women's football club based in Addis Ababa, Ethiopia. The club features in the Ethiopian Women's Premier League. The club is affiliated to CBE SA.

References 

2005 establishments in Ethiopia